Seekogel may refer to:

 Seekogel (Lechtal Alps)
 Seekogel (Ötztal Alps)